Morula aglaos is a species of sea snail, a marine gastropod mollusk in the family Muricidae, the murex snails or rock snails.

Description

Distribution
It is found in the Kwajalein Atoll, Marshall Islands.

References

External links
 MNHN, Paris: holotype

aglaos
Gastropods described in 1995
Endemic fauna of the Marshall Islands